Aleksandar Đukić (also transliterated Djukić; born 30 November 1980) is a Serbian professional footballer who plays as a striker. He is best remembered for his time at BSK Borča, scoring 50 league goals in almost 200 appearances for the side.

Honours
BSK Borča
 Serbian League Belgrade: 2005–06
Mačva Šabac
 Serbian League West: 2015–16

External links
 
 
 
 Aleksandar Đukić at Utakmica.rs 

1980 births
Living people
Association football forwards
Expatriate footballers in Montenegro
FK Banat Zrenjanin players
FK BSK Borča players
FK Budućnost Valjevo players
FK Čelik Nikšić players
FK Hajduk Kula players
FK Kolubara players
FK Mačva Šabac players
FK Mladost Lučani players
Montenegrin First League players
Serbian expatriate footballers
Serbian expatriate sportspeople in Montenegro
Serbian First League players
Serbian footballers
Serbian SuperLiga players
Sportspeople from Valjevo